Pain-de-Sucre is a neighbourhood (quartier) of Terre-de-Haut Island, located in Les Saintes, Guadeloupe. It is located in the southwestern part of the island. This is a residential quartier of Terre-de-Haut Island. It is a natural anchorage. The famous Pain de sucre of the archipelago is located on this quartier.

To see
Pain de sucre: This is a famous mountain of les Saintes. It is constituted by an alignment of basalt columns plunging into the blue waters of the bay of les Saintes.
The beaches called Petite Anse du Pain de sucre and Anse Devant are two small beautiful beaches of white sand and turquoise water.

Notes  

Populated places in Îles des Saintes
Quartiers of Îles des Saintes